George Cavendish may refer to:

 George Cavendish, 1st Earl of Burlington (1754–1834), Member of the United Kingdom Parliament
 George Cavendish (writer) (circa 1494–1562), English writer
 George Henry Compton Cavendish (1784–1809), English politician
 Lord George Augustus Cavendish (died 1794), British politician
 Lord George Henry Cavendish (1810–1880), Member of the United Kingdom Parliament
 George Cavendish-Bentinck (1821–1891), British barrister, Conservative politician, and cricketer
 George Cavendish (Irish politician) (1766–1849), Anglo-Irish politician